eToonz is a South African digital satellite television free-to-air children's channel created and owned by eMedia Investments's e.tv. The channel broadcasts for a duration of 16 hours from Sunday to Friday, 17 hours on Saturday and 18 hours with movies during the school holidays.

History
eToonz started as a 30 to 60 minute segment on the defunct Little e block which featured animated programs such as The Adventures Of Lerato and Alex and Deep & Dylan's Curious Minds - South African produced content.

e.tv as a broadcaster launched eKasi+,eToonz+, eMovies+ and eAfrica+ as new sister channels as the first of its planned set of TV channels for digital terrestrial television (DTT). e.tv, the SABC and M-Net plan to each roll out their own collections of additional TV channels in South Africa eventually.

Since government incompetence and industry infighting has long-delayed the digital switch-over process known as digital migration, e.tv launched its first 4 additional free-to-air TV channels on OpenView HD, although the channels will become publicly available to all viewers once DTT starts.

e.tv, tired, frustrated and becoming increasingly scared over its inability to grow its potential market share and possible diminishing returns on its existing market which could evaporate in the face of ongoing TV channel and audience fragmentation in South Africa, decided to no longer wait for DTT but to forge ahead and start launching its additional channels. as eToonz+ along with eKasi+ (now eExtra), eAfrica+(now defunct) and eMovies+(now eMovies).

At launch, StarSat entered talks with eMedia Investments over the potential of including their channels into their platform before things didn't work out.

In 2017, news leaked that about the channel's possible availability on DStv before being made official on May 17 alongside eMovies, eMovies Extra and eExtra. Later that year, e.tv gave eMovies+ and eToonz+ a reimaging; with digital television established, the "+" symbol imagery was also dropped from those two networks.

eToonz and three other e.tv services were going to be removed from DStv on 1 April 2022 but the channel remained on DStv for another 2 months as the eMedia Investments filed an application to the Competition Tribunal regarding their carriage agreement with MultiChoice.

By the end of May 2022, the channel ceased transmission on the DStv platform alongside eExtra, eMovies and eMovies Extra. The channel was supplemented by PBS Kids and DreamWorks Channel.

In August 2022, eToonz alongside eMovies, eMovies Extra and eExtra were reinstated on the DStv platform for another 6 months following pending investigation.

Programming

Most of the channel's content comes from the Craz-e block on e.tv. Certain shows that weren't added onto the channel were the blocks former live-action youth shows. eToonz broadcasts wide range of cartoons, from pre-school shows like Teletubbies, Peppa Pig and Super Why, with other cartoons from Dreamworks Animation like Spirit Riding Free, Voltron: Legendary Defender, Trollhunters: Tales Of Arcadia; also anime like the Pokémon animated series and others such as The Deep.

References

External links

Television stations in South Africa
Television channels and stations established in 2013
Children's television networks